Kistauri is a village in the Akhmeta district, Kakheti region, Georgia. The village lies on the right bank of Alazani River, in the northeastern foothills of the Gombori Range.

According to the population census data of Georgia (2014), 1,729 people live in Kistauri. This village was the homeland for Georgian poet and playwright Raphael Eristavi.

Gallery

See also
 Kakheti

References 

 GSE, (1986) volume  X, page 537, Tbilisi.

Populated places in Kakheti
Tiflis Governorate